Haan is surname of Dutch origin (Dutch spelling of ). People with this name include:
Arie Haan (b. 1948), Dutch professional football player and manager
Edmond Haan (b. 1924), French professional football player
Gijsbert Haan (1801–1874), Dutch-American religious leader, founder of the Christian Reformed Church in the United States and Canada
Khar Haan (b. 1955), African-European businessman, founder of the Socialist Party of Amsterdam
William G. Haan (1863–1924), American army officer during WWI

See also
De Haan (surname)
Han (Korean surname)
Haan (Mongolian surname)

Dutch-language surnames
Surnames from nicknames